Christian Camacho (born July 11, 1988) is an American soccer player of Colombian descent who currently plays for New Amsterdam FC in the National Independent Soccer Association.

Career
Camacho left the United States in 2005 to play in Moldova with FC Zaria Bălți, before returning to the US to play with USL PDL clubs Brooklyn Knights and Westchester Flames.

Camacho returned to Moldova, again with FC Zaria Bălți, before transferring to FC Sfântul Gheorghe in 2011.

On August 13, 2014 Camacho signed with USL Pro club Dayton Dutch Lions.

References

1988 births
Living people
American soccer players
Brooklyn Knights players
Westchester Flames players
Dayton Dutch Lions players
F.A. Euro players
New Amsterdam FC players
Association football midfielders
USL League Two players
National Independent Soccer Association players
American sportspeople of Colombian descent
Soccer players from New York City
American expatriate soccer players
Expatriate footballers in Moldova
American expatriate sportspeople in Moldova
CSF Bălți players
FC Sfîntul Gheorghe players